Ulster Protestant League may refer to:

Ulster Protestant League (1931), a loyalist organisation in Northern Ireland
Ulster Protestant League (1980), associated with George Seawright
A registered party led by Tommy Kirkham, formerly of the Ulster Political Research Group